Agrotis daedalus is a moth of the family Noctuidae. It is found throughout the Great Plains, from west Texas, New Mexico and Arizona west to northern Nevada north to southern Alberta and south central Saskatchewan.

The wingspan is about 38 mm. Adults are on wing in early spring. There is one generation per year.

Agrotis
Moths of North America
Moths described in 1890